George William Cope Donkin (1 December 1892 – 1927) was an English footballer who played in the Football League for Barnsley.

Career
Donkin was born in Carlton and played junior football for Wharncliffe Woodmoor in 1910, Royston Midland in 1911, Monckton Athletic in 1912 and Mirfield United from where he signed for Second Division Barnsley in 1913 and made his Football League debut that November at Clapton Orient. By the next season he had become a first team regular, however the interruption of World War I, during which he served in the Army, meant he lost four seasons of his career. He played both sides of the War for Barnsley and he was an England trialist in an England v The North match in January 1922 and also represented Sheffield & Hallamshire in the annual match against Glasgow.

An ever present in Barnsley’s 1920–21 campaign, he missed three matches as Barnsley finished third in the Second Division in 1921–22 campaign, narrowly missing out on promotion. He played his last match in February 1925 and possibly suffered a career ending injury (as he received a payment for £250 from The Football League at the end of the season, presumably compensation for his injury), in total he scored 20 goals in 243 appearances, playing the whole time in the Second Division, retiring in 1925 and passing away two years later in 1927 in his mid-thirties.

Career statistics
Source:

References

1892 births
1927 deaths
English footballers
Association football forwards
English Football League players
Barnsley F.C. players
Monckton Athletic F.C. players
Mirfield United F.C. players
British Army personnel of World War I